Huntsville International Airport  (Carl T. Jones Field) is a public airport and spaceport ten miles southwest of downtown Huntsville, in Madison County, Alabama, United States.

The airport is part of the Port of Huntsville (along with the International Intermodal Center and Jetplex Industrial Park), and serves the Huntsville-Decatur Combined Statistical Area. Opened in October 1967 as the Huntsville Jetport, this was the third airport for Huntsville. Today it has 12 gates with restrooms, shops, restaurants, phones and murals depicting aviation and space exploration scenes. There is a Four Points by Sheraton above the ticketing area/lobby, and adjacent to the terminal is a parking garage and to opposite sides are the control tower and a golf course.

Huntsville is frequently used as a diversion airport from larger hubs in the Southeast, such as Atlanta, due to its long runways and sophisticated snow removal and de-icing equipment.

The airport's "Fly Huntsville" jingle encourages passengers to depart from Huntsville instead of driving to Birmingham or Nashville. An August 2009 report by the Bureau of Transportation Statistics for the first quarter of 2009 revealed that Huntsville passengers paid, on average, the highest airfares in the United States. The airport reported that commercial airline passenger traffic at Huntsville International increased 2.3% in January 2010 over the previous year.

The National Plan of Integrated Airport Systems for 2011–2015 called it a primary commercial service airport. Federal Aviation Administration records say the airport had 612,690 passenger boardings (enplanements) in calendar year 2008, 572,767 in 2009 and 606,127 in 2010.

History
The original airport, Huntsville Flying Field / Mayfair Airport, was south of the city. It had sod runways, no lighting and opened in the early 1930s. By 1934 the airport had four dirt/sod runways, southwest of today's intersection of Whitesburg Drive and Bob Wallace Avenue.

A second airport south of downtown opened in 1941 with two paved runways, Runway 18/36 being 4,000' long. The terminal building was a wooden shack at the northeast end of Runway 5/23; the National Weather Service opened at the municipal airport in 1958. The second airport was near today's intersection of Memorial Parkway and Airport Road; traces of runways and terminal facilities can be seen from the air.

HSV's first scheduled jets were United 727s in late 1966. The current airport opened in 1967, west of the city along Highway 20. A ribbon cutting ceremony was held 15 September 1968 with Dr. Wernher von Braun and Senator John Sparkman in attendance.

On July 10, 2018, the airport announced that Frontier Airlines would begin nonstop service to Denver and Orlando in October with the A320 Family. This marked the resumption of low-cost airline presence at Huntsville as AirTran Airways had previously operated at the airport with 717s, but pulled out in 2012 due to low passenger numbers.

Airport facilities
The airport covers 6,000 acres (2,428 ha) at an elevation of 629 feet (192 m). It has two asphalt runways: 18R/36L is 12,600 by 150 feet (3,840 x 46 m) and 18L/36R is 10,001 by 150 feet (3,048 x 46 m).

In the year ending December 31, 2019, the airport had 70,816 aircraft operations, average 194 per day: 37% military, 15% air taxi, 26% general aviation, and 21% airline. 86 aircraft were then based at the airport: 64 single-engine, 15 multi-engine, 6 jet and 1 ultralight.

Airlines and destinations
Huntsville International Airport is served by six passenger airlines representing the three international airline alliances. Some service is flown by the regional affiliates via code sharing agreements. Eight cargo airlines serve the airport; four (Cargolux from Luxembourg, Volga-Dnepr Airlines from Russia, Latam Cargo Brazil and Panalpina from Switzerland) are foreign. Cargolux and Panalpina fly only Boeing 747s. Formerly, the airport was also served by Latam Cargo Colombia.

Passenger

Destination map

Cargo

Statistics

Top destinations

Other statistics

Past airline service
In 1969-80, Huntsville had nonstop or direct flights to Los Angeles, Florida and Texas during the U.S. space program. These flights served the NASA Marshall Space Flight Center in Huntsville.

In June 1967, Eastern Airlines introduced "The Space Corridor" linking Huntsville with St. Louis, Seattle and the NASA Kennedy Space Center in Florida. In the June 13, 1967, timetable, Eastern Boeing 727-100s flew to St. Louis and on to Seattle, and nonstop to Orlando continuing to Melbourne, Florida, near the Kennedy Space Center. Eastern flew direct Douglas DC-9-30s to Houston, home of the NASA Johnson Space Center, via New Orleans in the late 1960s. Eastern had direct jets to Chicago during the early 1970s via Nashville. In April 1975, Eastern served Nashville, Orlando and St. Louis nonstop from Huntsville on 727s and DC-9s.

In November 1967, Eastern scheduled nine departures each weekday from the new airport while United had four and Southern had 17.

United Airlines started nonstop Boeing 727-100s to Los Angeles in 1969. United first served Huntsville in 1961 when it acquired Capital Airlines which had scheduled Vickers Viscounts nonstop from Huntsville's old airport (at ) (1949 diagram) to Memphis, Knoxville and Washington, D.C. and direct to New York (LaGuardia and Newark) and Philadelphia. Until 1967, United used the same Viscounts, then introduced Boeing 727-100s into Huntsville in 1966. In April 1975, United served Greensboro, Knoxville, Los Angeles and Washington, D.C. nonstop from Huntsville on 727s and 737s. Raleigh/Durham service was added by 1979. In August 1982, United had direct 727s to Los Angeles, San Francisco and Denver and nonstop Boeing 737-200s to Washington, D.C.

Southern Airways also served Huntsville. In the late 1960s, Southern introduced 75-seat Douglas DC-9-10s into their fleet which had consisted of 40-seat Martin 4-0-4. Southern's timetable in September 1968 listed nonstop jets to Atlanta, Memphis, New Orleans and Muscle Shoals, AL; Southern was still flying Martin 4-0-4s from Huntsville. In April 1975, Southern DC-9s flew nonstop to Atlanta, Chattanooga, Memphis, Montgomery, Muscle Shoals, Nashville, New Orleans and Orlando. Southern had direct DC-9s to New York City (LaGuardia Airport), Washington, D,C. (Dulles Airport), Denver, St. Louis, Detroit and Wichita. In 1979, Southern merged with North Central Airlines to form Republic Airlines which continued to serve Huntsville, by that time having dropped Chattanooga and Montgomery service and having added Greenville/Spartanburg and Mobile/Pascagoula service. Republic was acquired by Northwest Airlines which later merged with Delta Air Lines.

Service to Atlanta hit a high point in early 1985 when 17 nonstops a day flew HSV to ATL on four airlines, three flying "main line" jets. In the February 15, 1985, Official Airline Guide, Eastern Airlines had Boeing 727-100s and Douglas DC-9-50s, Republic Airlines was flying Douglas DC-9-10s, DC-9-30s and DC-9-50s, United Airlines flew 727-100s and Delta Connection, operated by Atlantic Southeast Airlines (ASA, which became ExpressJet), had de Havilland Canada DHC-7s and Shorts 360s. Today, Delta Air Lines and affiliate Delta Connection are the only airlines between Huntsville and Atlanta.

By 1989, the airport was linked to major airline hubs: Delta served Atlanta and Dallas/Fort Worth, Eastern served Atlanta, American served Dallas/Fort Worth and Nashville, Northwest served Memphis, and United served Chicago and Washington Dulles. United and American flew nonstop to Birmingham, United continued to fly nonstop to Knoxville, and Delta had a daily flight to Memphis. United pulled out entirely by 1995, while USAir entered the market in the early 1990s with daily flights to Charlotte.

Only Delta Air Lines operates main line jets to the airport now. Frontier previously had Airbus A320 service nonstop to Denver and Orlando. Delta operates Boeing 717 and McDonnell Douglas MD-88 aircraft to Atlanta. The airline previously flew Douglas DC-9-50s nonstop to Atlanta with some flights being flown by ExpressJet Canadair CRJ-700 and CRJ-200s as Delta Connection service to ATL; however, all services to ATL have been switched to mainline jets. The airport had service to New Orleans on GLO Airlines, but that ended after the airline filed for bankruptcy in 2017. Frontier Airlines ended service in 2022.

Expansion

In 1989, Huntsville International became the first airport in the United States to install an ASR-9 dual-channel airport surveillance radar system. as well as one of five airports to use glass walled jet bridges in the U.S.

Currently, Huntsville International is undergoing major renovations of the concourse facilities, which will add:
A $60 million terminal expansion (under construction)
An expanded  concession area on concourse (opened April 12, 2008)
Upgraded flight information display systems at gates & parking areas (completed in 2007)
A parking deck expansion with 1,330 additional parking spaces (completed in December 2008)
An enlarged  public waiting and security screening area (completed in June 2009)
An expansion on the west runway, making it the second longest in the southeast (completed in 2006)
A new taxiway between both runways with a  tunnel running underneath (under construction)
Security system improvement (completed in October 2008)
Taxiway "L" between the airport's east and west runways (completed in October 2008)
Dirt work on a new Jetplex Industrial Park north access road linking the airport's entrance to Wall Triana Highway (completed in July 2008)
AirTran started servicing HSV with direct flights to Orlando in May 2010 and to Baltimore in June 2010. AirTran ended all service on August 12, 2012.

Also, plans are underway for another terminal area, added runways, and the lengthening of the two current runways.

Accidents and incidents
 On April 4, 1977, A Douglas DC-9-31 operating as Southern Airways Flight 242 took off from Huntsville after a stopover from Muscle Shoals, and encountered severe storms shortly after. Hail later struck the plane causing the plane engines to fail, and shortly thereafter the airplane crashed near New Hope, Georgia. 63 were killed aboard the plane and also nine people on the ground; 20 passengers and two crew members survived.
On June 18, 2014, an IAI Westwind corporate aircraft crashed upon takeoff, killing all three on board.

References

External links
 
 Aerial image as of March 2002 from USGS The National Map
 
 

Huntsville-Decatur, AL Combined Statistical Area
Landmarks in Alabama
Transportation in Huntsville, Alabama
Airports established in 1967
Airports in Madison County, Alabama
1967 establishments in Alabama